Annelie Grund (born 28 June 1953, Berlin) is a German artist, stained glass artist, artist and musician. She lives in Wandlitz and is married to the architect Manfred Thon.

Biography 

1976 she acquired the diploma at the Humboldt University of Berlin in the subjects of art, painting and German language and literature studies. 1983 she got the master craftsman's diploma as stained-glass artist. Since 1979 she is a freelance artist and stained-glass artist in her own studio and workshop.

Music 
Since her childhood she practices overtone singing. She received lessons by the choir director Christian Bollmann in Düsseldorf and for a long time took part in the Berlin Didgeridoo-Orchestra. She performed music in the DUO Bernstein (1996–2001). Nowadays she makes music during projects of art with her husband.

Glass Art 

She implemented many projects of glass art which are displayed in public, mostly made of glass, but also of steel and stone, painted windowpanes in churches and freestanding objects of glass and glassware paintings.
In 2007 she created the monument (errant block) at the water divide between the rivers Elbe and Oder at the Wandlitzsee. In 2012 she created The blue band of the river Panke, a project of glass art at the staircase of the parking garage in Bernau.

Works in churches 

 2003 glass altarpiece in the church in the village of Lünow in Brandenburg
 2003 Glass altarpiece in the church in the village of Lünow in Brandenburg, Cross and Labyrinth
 
 1999–2002 painted windowpanes in the church in Oderberg
 1999–2016 painted windowpanes in the church in Fürstenberg/Eisenhüttenstadt
 1999 glass  – Sound – Installation in the church in Netzeband
 1998 painted windowpanes in the church in Helfta
 1998 Kraftfelder glass  – Sound – Installation in Kloster Chorin
 1997–1999 painted windowpanes in the Catholic church in Malchow/Mecklenburg
 1996 painted windowpanes in the funeral chapel of the Luisenkirchhof Berlin-Charlottenburg
 1995 painted windowpanes in a Catholic nurse hostel in Berlin-Biesdorf
 1994 painted windowpanes in the funeral chapel of the crematory in Berlin-Baumschulenweg
 1994 painted windowpanes in the New Apostolic Church in Gifhorn 
 1994 painted windowpanes in a chapel in the Hotel Albrechtshof in Berlin
 1993 painted windowpanes in the church in Teschendorf
 1991 painted windowpanes in the church in Radeland, Berlin-Spandau

Exhibitions 
 2014 Fachwerkkirche Glambeck, messages and symbols
 2013 Berlin, Inselgalerie, glass objects
 2012 Cottbus, Städtische Galerie im Rathaus, glass objects
 2011 Hobrechtsfelde, Acryl – LED – steles of glass and sound
 2011 Eberswalde, Städtische Galerie, glass objects
 2010 Bernau, Galerie Schauß, frottages, drawings
 2009 Potsdam, Galerie Sehmsdorf, glass objects
 2007 Müncheberg, Stadtpfarrkirche glass objects, frottages, pastels
 2006 Prenden, Dorfkirche, glass objects, frottages
 2004 Fürstenwalde Kunstgalerie im Alten Rathaus, frottages and glass paintings
 2003 Berlin, Galerie Form und Stil, glass paintings
 2002 Grimme Kunsthof Barna v. Sartory, steles of glass
 2002 Oderberg, Nikolaikirche, frottages and sound
 2001 Wiesenburg, Galerie im Schloß, steles of glass
 1998 Kloster Chorin, Installation Kraftfelder steles of glass and sound
 1997 Templin Galerie im neuen Gymnasium, objects of glass and sound
 1997 Berlin, Ölbergkirche, slides and sound
 1996 Eberswalde, Städtische Galerie, symbols and countryside
 1995 Berlin, Galerie im Wartesaal, symbols and countryside

Monument for the victims of witch-hunt in Bernau 

In 2005 she created the monument for the victims of witch-hunt in Bernau with the support of the state of Brandenburg, the district of Barnim, the city of Bernau and donations of citizens of Bernau.

Bibliography 
 Herbert Schirmer: Annelie Grund. Objekt, Grafik, Malerei, in: 38 Künstler in Barnim, Hrsg: Sabine Voerster. Infopunkt Kunst. Netzwerk für Bildende Kunst und Kunsthandwerk in Barnim, Wandlitz–Prenden 2015, no pagination  (Annelie Grund. Objet d'art, art design, painting)
 Anita Bauermeister: Die Bleiglasfenster, in: 100 Jahre Kirche Sophienstädt 1914–2014, Hrsg.: Evangelische Kirchengemeinde Ruhlsdorf–Marienwerder–Sophienstädt, 2014, p. 18–20, vgl. https://web.archive.org/web/20160304002017/http://www.kirche-ruhlsdorf.de/sophien.htm (stained glass windows in the church of Sophienstädt)
 Tom Norberg: Glas in Museen fotografieren in: Glashaus/Glasshouse, Internationales Magazin für Studioglas, Krefeld, Nr. 02/ 2013, p. 18 (Taking photos of glass in museums)
 Gunda Hörner: Glück und Glas, in: Handmade Kultur Magazin, Hrsg.: Handmade Kultur Verlag Hamburg (HKV Hamburg GmbH), Hamburg, Nr. 06/ 2012, pp. 52–55 (Happiness and Glass)
 Sabine Horn: Fernsehbeitrag rbb, Enthüllung des Denkmals für die Opfer der Hexenverfolgung Bernau – Ein Jahr danach, 30. Oktober 2006 (television report: One Year after the inauguration of the monument for the victims of witch-hunt in Bernau)
 Thomas Steierkoffer: Hörstück "Hexen" – Der Professor und die Künstlerin, rbb, 19. Februar 2006 (radio feature: Witches – the Professor and the artist)
 Klaus Lampe: Radio Essay zur Enthüllung des Denkmals für die Opfer der Hexenverfolgung Bernau, rbb, 29. Oktober 2005 (radio feature: Inauguration of the monument for the victims of witch-hunt in Bernau)
 Richard H. Gross: Stained glass in Germany, in: Stained Glass, Hrsg.: Stained Glass Association of America, Lee's Summit, Spring 1996, p. 42

External links 
 Homepage of Annelie Grund
 Exhibition at the Glasbrücke Berlin 2007
 Arts and Craft in Barnim (in German)
 Annelie Grund in: Organisation of Artists in Brandenburg (in German)

References

1953 births
Living people
German stained glass artists and manufacturers
Artists from Berlin
20th-century German women artists
21st-century German women artists
Humboldt University of Berlin alumni